The 71st Street station is a local station on the BMT West End Line of the New York City Subway, located at the intersection of 71st Street and New Utrecht Avenue in Bensonhurst, Brooklyn. It is served by the D train at all times.

History 
The 71st Street station opened on June 24, 1916 along with the first portion of the BMT West End Line from 36th Street on the BMT Fourth Avenue Line to 18th Avenue station. The line was originally a surface excursion railway to Coney Island, called the Brooklyn, Bath and Coney Island Railroad, which was established in 1862, but did not reach Coney Island until 1864. Under the Dual Contracts of 1913, an elevated line was built over New Utrecht Avenue, 86th Street and Stillwell Avenue. The section of the West End Line between 62nd Street and 18th Avenue originally opened with only one track in service. The second track between 62nd Street and 18th Avenue opened on July 8, 1916.

In 2012, the station was rehabilitated with funding from the American Recovery and Reinvestment Act of 2009.

Station layout

This elevated station has three tracks and two side platforms. The center express track is not normally used. Both platforms have beige windscreens and brown canopies with green frames and support columns along their entire lengths except for small sections at either ends. Here, they have waist-high black steel fences with lampposts at regular intervals. The station signs are in the standard black plates with white lettering.

Exits
The station has two fare control areas, both of which are elevated station houses beneath the platforms and tracks. The full-time one is at the south end. A single staircase from each platform go down to a waiting area/crossunder, where a turnstile bank provides access to/from the system. Outside fare control, there is a token booth and four staircases going down to all corners of New Utrecht Avenue and 71st Street. The two southern staircases face south while the two northern ones face east or west.

The station's other fare control area towards the north end is un-staffed. A single staircase from each platform goes down to a landing around a now-closed station house. A single full height turnstile provides access to/from the station before another staircase goes down to either southern corners of New Utrecht Avenue and 69th Street. Nearby is the Lieutenant Joseph Petrosino Park.

References

External links 
 
 Station Reporter — D Train
 71st Street on TheSubwayNut 
 71st Street entrance from Google Maps Street View
 Bay Ridge Avenue (69th Street) entrance from Google Maps Street View
 Platforms from Google Maps Street View

BMT West End Line stations
New York City Subway stations in Brooklyn
Railway stations in the United States opened in 1916
1916 establishments in New York City
Bensonhurst, Brooklyn